The 115th Pennsylvania Volunteer Infantry was an infantry regiment that served in the Union Army during the American Civil War.

Service
The 115th Pennsylvania Infantry was organized at Harrisburg and Philadelphia, Pennsylvania beginning November 6, 1861 and mustered in January 28, 1862 for a three-year enlistment under the command of Colonel Robert Emmet Patterson.

The regiment was attached to 3rd Brigade, 2nd Division, III Corps, Army of the Potomac, to March 1864. 1st Brigade, 4th Division, II Corps, to May 1864. 3rd Brigade, 3rd Division, II Corps, to June 1864.

The 115th Pennsylvania Infantry ceased to exist on June 22, 1864 when it was consolidated with the 110th Pennsylvania Infantry.

Detailed service
Moved from Camden to Harrisburg, Pennsylvania, May 31, 1862, then to Camp Hamilton, Virginia, June 25–28, and to Harrison's Landing, Virginia, July 4. Duty at Harrison's Landing, Virginia, until August 16, 1862. Moved to Centreville August 16–26. Action at Bristoe Station or Kettle Run August 27. Battle of Groveton August 29. Second Battle of Bull Run August 30. Duty in the defenses of Washington until November. At Fairfax Station November 2–25. Operations on Orange & Alexandria Railroad November 10–12. Duty near Falmouth, Virginia, November 28 – December 11. Battle of Fredericksburg December 12–15. Burnside's 2nd Campaign, "Mud March," January 20–24, 1863. Operations at Rappahannock Bridge and Grove Church February 5–7. Chancellorsville Campaign April 27 – May 6. Battle of Chancellorsville May 1–5. Gettysburg Campaign June 11 – July 24. Battle of Gettysburg, July 1–3. Pursuit of Lee, July 5–24. Wapping Heights, Virginia, July 23. Duty near Warrenton, Virginia, until October. Bristoe Campaign October 9–22. McLean's Ford, Bull Run, October 15. Advance to line of the Rappahannock November 7–8. Kelly's Ford November 7. Mine Run Campaign November 26 – December 2. Payne's Farm November 27. Demonstration on the Rapidan February 6–7, 1864. Duty near Brandy Station until May. Rapidan Campaign, May 4 – June 12. Battle of the Wilderness, May 5–7. Spotsylvania, May 8–12. Spotsylvania Court House May 12–21. Assault on the Salient, May 12. North Anna River, May 23–26. On line of the Pamunkey, May 26–28. Totopotomoy, May 28–31. Cold Harbor, June 1–12. Before Petersburg June 16–18.

Casualties
The regiment lost a total of 80 men during service; six officers and 32 enlisted men killed or mortally wounded, two officers and 40 enlisted men died of disease.

Commanders
 Colonel Robert Emmet Patterson – discharged December 2, 1862
 Colonel Francis A. Lancaster – killed in action at the Battle of Chancellorsville
 Lieutenant Colonel Robert Thompson – commanded at the Second Battle of Bull Run
 Lieutenant Colonel William A. Olmsted – commanded at the Battle of Fredericksburg
 Lieutenant Colonel John P. Dunne – commanded the regiment after the death of Col Lancaster until consolidated with the 110th Pennsylvania Infantry
 Major William A. Reilly – commanded at the Battle of the Wilderness

See also

 List of Pennsylvania Civil War Units
 Pennsylvania in the Civil War

References
 Dyer, Frederick H. A Compendium of the War of the Rebellion (Des Moines, IA: Dyer Pub. Co.), 1908.
Attribution

External links
 115th Pennsylvania Infantry monument at Gettysburg Battlefield

Military units and formations established in 1861
Military units and formations disestablished in 1864
Units and formations of the Union Army from Pennsylvania